Beatrix (minor planet designation: 83 Beatrix) is a fairly large asteroid orbiting in the inner part of the main asteroid belt. It was discovered by Annibale de Gasparis on April 26, 1865. It was his last asteroid discovery. A diameter of at least  was determined from the Beatrician stellar occultation observed on June 15, 1983. It is named for Beatrice Portinari, beloved of Dante Alighieri and immortalized by him in La Vita Nuova and The Divine Comedy.

On February 16, 2001, an occultation of a magnitude +9.09 star by this asteroid was observed from three locations. The resulting chords matched an elliptical profile with a mean radius of 35.9 km. The observers noted some dimming and flickering at the beginning of the event, which may indicate the star was binary or the asteroid has an irregular shape. Previous occultations had been observed in 1983 and 1990, which produced a much larger size estimate of 81.4 km.

References

External links
 
 

Background asteroids
Beatrix
Beatrix
83 Beatrix
X-type asteroids (Tholen)
X-type asteroids (SMASS)
18650426